Eupithecia nigrinotata is a moth in the family Geometridae first described by Charles Swinhoe in 1895. It is found in Nepal, Thailand and the Indian state of Assam.

References

Moths described in 1895
nigrinotata
Moths of Asia